District 86 may refer to:
 Hinsdale Township High School District 86
 Union Ridge School District 86
 East Peoria Elementary School District 86
 Joliet Public Schools District 86